Erwin Schwab (born 1964) is a German amateur astronomer and discoverer of minor planets, who works at the GSI Helmholtz Centre for Heavy Ion Research, near Darmstadt, Germany. He has discovered and co-discovered more than 80 asteroids from the Starkenburg , Tzec Maun  and Taunus observatories . As volunteer scientist for the European Space Agency (ESA) he recovered near-Earth objects and comets. From 2014 to 2021 he recovered 30 lost comets, which equates to about 25% of the worldwide proportion in that timespan. Using the Schmidt telescope at Calar Alto Observatory  to search for a lost comet he discovered in 2019 a unique variable star – the first known eclipsing stream-fed intermediate polar, cataloged as J1832.4-1627 (VSX-Id of AAVSO: 000-BNG-512)

Biography 

Schwab was born in Heppenheim, where he started observing minor planets at the Starkenburg Observatory in 1981.

Honors and awards 

The Observatorio Astronómico de La Sagra in Spain has named the main-belt asteroid 185638 Erwinschwab in his honour.

Discoveries 

One which he discovered is named after his parents, Elfriede and Erwin Schwab. Schwab has discovered asteroids at Starkenburg, Tzec Maun as well as at the Taunus Observatory. Some minor planet are named for German cities such as 204852 Frankfurt, 241418 Darmstadt, and 243440 Colonia (Cologne), while the Jupiter-trojans 192220 Oicles and 221917 Opites are named after figures from Greek mythology. He also co-discovered , an unnumbered Apollo asteroid and potentially hazardous object.

List of discovered minor planets

Works 
 Kleinplaneten-Entdeckungen in Deutschland (German). Epubli Verlag, Berlin 2016, .

References

External links 
 Erwin Schwab's Home Page

20th-century German astronomers
Discoverers of asteroids

Living people
1964 births
21st-century German astronomers